Government First Grade College, Krishnarajapuram, is a general degree college located at Krishnarajapuram (K.R. Puram), Bangalore, Karnatka. It is established in the year 1991. The college is affiliated with Bangalore University. This college offers different courses in arts, science and commerce.

Departments

Science
Physics
Chemistry
Mathematics
Botany
Zoology
Electronics
Computer Science

Arts and Commerce
Kannada
English
History
Political Science
Sociology
Journalism
Economics
Business Administration
Commerce

Accreditation
The college is  recognized by the University Grants Commission (UGC).

References

External links
http://gfgc.kar.nic.in/krpuram/
http://www.gfgckrpuram.kar.nic.in

Educational institutions established in 1991
1991 establishments in Karnataka
Colleges affiliated to Bangalore University
Colleges in Bangalore
Krishnarajapuram